Milho frito (fried cornmeal in English) is a typical Madeira side dish made of cornmeal, finely sliced collard greens (although kale is a common substitute), water, garlic, lard and olive oil cooked slowly and cooled into forms. Similar to a very firm polenta, it is cut into cubes and fried. It is usually served with espetada and other regional dishes in Madeira.

See also
 List of maize dishes

References 

Madeiran cuisine
Portuguese cuisine
Maize dishes